Shawnee is an unincorporated community and post office in northern Park County, Colorado, United States, that is a historic district listed on the National Register of Historic Places (NRHP).

Description
Shawnee is situated along the North Fork South Platte River, west of Bailey on U.S. Route 285.

Shawnee consists of a general store and post office, and surrounding houses, on the hillside south of the highway overlooking the river valley.

History

A post office called Shawnee has been in operation since 1900. The community takes its name from nearby Shawnee Peak.

The Shawnee Historic District was added to the NRHP July 8, 2010.

See also

 National Register of Historic Places listings in Park County, Colorado

References

External links

Towns in Park County, Colorado
Towns in Colorado
1889 establishments in Colorado